Arnold Manoff (April 25, 1914 – February 10, 1965) was an American screenwriter who was blacklisted by the Hollywood movie studio bosses in the 1950s.

As a result of the blacklist he wrote under a pseudonym through the 1960s. Manoff's experiences while blacklisted were among the inspirations for the 1976 film The Front.

Career

Early writing 
Manoff was born in New York City. He did not attend college and quit school at age fifteen. He began writing and won a contest in Story magazine. In the 1930s he assembled games and songs of the streets of the city for the Works Progress Administration's Writer's Project.

His first novel, Telegram From Heaven, published by Dial Press in 1942, recounts the struggle of an unemployed stenographer from the viewpoint of the stenographer, A review of the book in The New York Times said that Manoff  "has written a readable book, pulsing with life," and that he "knows the life of the submerged poor and he has an intimate sympathy for them."

Films and theater 
Manoff's first screenplay was made into the 1944 film Man from Frisco. Three more of his screenplays were made into movies prior to his being blacklisted: My Buddy (1944), Casbah (1948, starring Peter Lorre and Yvonne De Carlo), and No Minor Vices (1948, starring Dana Andrews, Lilli Palmer, and Louis Jordan.

His novella All You Need is One Good Break was published in Story and produced on Broadway in 1950, in a production starring John Berry. The reviews were described by featured player Lee Grant as  "scathing." The New York Times theater critic Brooks Atkinson  called the play "a tabloid tale about a tenement wastrel" and said it was "maudlin when it was not commonplace."  The Brooklyn Daily Eagle also panned the play, calling it a "tiresome, rather whiny business." The review praised the performance of Lee Grant, who left the hit play Detective Story to join the cast. All You Need is One Good Break closed after four performances but was briefly revived later that year.

Blacklisting 
In April 1951, director Edward Dmytryk testified before the House Un-American Activities Committee (HUAC) that Manoff and other film writers and directors were members of the Communist Party. Later that year he was again identified before HUAC as a Communist by screenwriter and admitted former Communist Leo Townsend. He was blacklisted.

Grant, who became his wife, was also blacklisted after she gave an impassioned eulogy at the memorial service for the blacklisted actor J. Edward Bromberg, who appeared in All You Need is One Good Break. Her name later appeared in the publication Red Channels, and as a result, for the next ten years, she too was blacklisted and her work in television and movies was limited. In a 2014 interview, Grant said that she knew nothing about Communism and said "it was one of the big rifts between my husband and myself. He was a Communist. And I didn't have the base for that kind of philosophy. I just couldn't understand it."

Later career 
While they were blacklisted, Manoff and fellow Jewish writers Abraham Polonsky and Walter Bernstein formed what has been described as a "kind of collective to help each other survive by writing under the table" for television, mainly for the historical series You Are There.

Manoff used the pseudonym "Joel Carpenter."  In addition to You Are There, he wrote episodes of Naked City, Route 66, and The Defenders. At the time of his death in 1965 he was adapting for film a Bernard Malamud story that was to star Harry Belafonte. Walter Grauman, who directed a Naked City episode written by Manoff, said years later that he was shocked to learn that his real name was not "Carpenter" and discovered it by accident. He called Manoff a "terrific writer."

Legacy 
Walter Bernstein described Manoff as "a talent that never really flourished." A number of blacklisted writers produced scripts for the You Are There series, and author Erik Christiansen writes that "Arnold Manoff's story is the saddest of the You Are There team" and that he had difficulty getting off the blacklist.

The informal collective of Manoff, Bernstein, and Polonsky was dramatized in the 1976 film The Front, which was written by Bernstein. In an early scene, the Michael Murphy character, modeled on Bernstein, introduces the Woody Allen character to two other blacklisted writers.

Personal life
In her 2014 memoir I Said Yes to Everything, Lee Grant wrote that Manoff was known as "the silver fox" when she first met him in 1950 during rehearsals for All You Need is One Good Break, because of his white hair that made him look older than his 36 years. He'd already been married three times and had a nine-year-old daughter with his second wife, Ruth. He was married at the time to Marjorie MacGregor, the mother of his two sons, Tom and Michael. Grant recounted that she and Manoff were "an item" during production of the play.

Grant wrote that she was living at home before their marriage, and that her parents did not approve. She said that there was a "Pygmalion" aspect to their marriage, and that Manoff sought to instruct her on Soviet literature and politics. She wrote that Manoff had little interest in her upbringing and that she never met most members of his family, including his mother.

Manoff and Grant had a daughter, Dinah Manoff, who became an actress. They were separated at the time of his death.

Death 
Manoff died in 1965 of a heart ailment. He was survived by two daughters, two sons, two sisters, and his mother.

References

External links

American male screenwriters
Hollywood blacklist
Jewish American writers
Screenwriters from New York (state)
Writers from New York City
1914 births
1965 deaths
20th-century American male writers
20th-century American screenwriters
20th-century American Jews